Anouar El Moukhantir (born 30 August 1997) is a German professional footballer who plays as a midfielder for Austrian 2. Liga team Austria Wien II.

Career
A former youth academy player of 1. Simmeringer, El Moukhantir moved to Austria Wien in 2011. He made his debut for club's reserve side on 20 March 2015 in a Regionalliga match against Admira Wacker II. On 7 June 2019, he extended his contract with the club until June 2023.

Personal life
El Moukhantir is of Moroccan descent.

Career statistics

References

External links
 Anouar El Moukhantir at OFB 
 Austria Wien profile 
 

1997 births
Living people
German people of Moroccan descent
Sportspeople from Darmstadt
Association football midfielders
German footballers
2. Liga (Austria) players
Austrian Regionalliga players
FK Austria Wien players
German expatriate footballers
German expatriate sportspeople in Austria
Expatriate footballers in Austria